
Gmina Szczaniec is a rural gmina (administrative district) in Świebodzin County, Lubusz Voivodeship, in western Poland.

Villages
Gmina Szczaniec contains the villages and settlements of Brudzewo, Dąbrówka Mała, Kiełcze, Koźminek, Myszęcin, Nowe Karcze, Ojerzyce, Opalewo, Smardzewo, Szczaniec, Wilenko and Wolimirzyce.

Neighbouring gminas
Gmina Szczaniec is bordered by the gminas of Babimost, Sulechów, Świebodzin, Trzciel and Zbąszynek.

Twin towns – sister cities

Gmina Szczaniec is twinned with:
 Groß Pankow, Germany

References

Szczaniec
Świebodzin County